Von Iva was an all-girl electro soul-punk group out of San Francisco.

Members
Jillian Iva Meador - vocals
Bex (Rebecca Kupersmith) - keyboards
Lay Lay (Kelly Harris) - drums

Former members
Elizabeth Davis-Simpson - bass  (ex-7 Year Bitch)

Media appearance
Their song "Electricity" was used in Milestone srl game, SBK-09: Superbike World Championship (2009).

Their song "Feel it!" was used in Milestone srl game, Evolution GT (2006).

Discography

EPs
Von Iva - enhanced EP Cochon Records   (2004)
Our Own Island - enhanced LP Ruby Tower Records (2007)
Girls on Film - enhanced EP Von Iva Music (2008)

Compilations
"Not Hot To Trot" (+ Invisibles Remix) (The Rebel Sounds of) Frisco Disco #1: Vanishing / Von Iva split EP PrinceHouse Records (2004)
  "Soulshaker" on Greetings from Norcal - The Northern California Compilation Agent Records (2006)
"Same Sad Song" on Nostalgia Del Buio Cochon Records (2007)

Tours
The band was part of the "Hell on Heels Tour" and appeared live at the Knitting Factory in Hollywood, California March 11, 2009.

Television
The band performs in the 6th and final episode of the surfing lesbian reality series Curl Girls.

Yes Man
The band appeared in the film Yes Man as Munchausen by Proxy, the band backing the character played by actress Zooey Deschanel; they recorded four songs for the film's soundtrack. The songs were: Uh-Huh, Yes Man, Sweet Ballad, and Keystar.
The band got the part of the fictional ensemble in the film after the movie's music supervisor, Jonathan Karp, saw the cover of their CD in Amoeba Music in Hollywood.

Post-Von Iva
The band has since broken up, as the relationship between the three became more tense.

References

External links
www.voniva.com 
Von Iva on Myspace

People at Parties

Interviews
Believe in Von Iva SFist, Nov 17, 2004.
Episode 84: Von Iva The Bay Bridged podcast,October 2, 2007. (mp3)

Video
Curl Girls appearance Logo Channel, Jun 2007. (Flash)
PUNKCAST#1193 Live @ Cake Shop NYC on Aug 25, 2007. (RealPlayer, mp4)

All-female punk bands
American neo soul singers